L'homme au bob (literally The men with bucket hat) is the first studio album of Gradur, a French rapper of Congolese descent.

Track list
"Calibré" (2:51)
"Terrasser" (3:41)
"J'donne ça" (feat. Alonzo) (4:39)
"Jamais" (3:07)
"Militarizé" (feat. Niro) (4:30)
"Bloody Murder" (4:12)
"R.D.C." (3:07)
"Priez Pour Moi" (3:36)
"Bang Bang" (feat. Chief Keef) (3:45)
"Stringer Bell" (4:22)
"Verre de Sky" (3:54)
"La Douille" (feat. Lacrim) (4:54)
"Beef" (5:09)
"Makak" (3:56)
"#Lhommeaubob" (feat. Migos) (4:24)
"Secteur" (feat. Kayna Samet) (3:57)
"Confessions" (5:04)

Charts

Weekly charts

Year-end charts

References

2015 albums
French-language albums